Pedro Francisco Duque Duque, OF, OMSE (Madrid, 14 March 1963) is a Spanish astronaut and aeronautics engineer who served as Minister of Science of the Government of Spain from 2018 to 2021. He was also Member of the Congress of Deputies from May 2019 until February 2020.

Biography

Early life and education 
He was born in Madrid in 1963. His father was an air traffic controller and his mother a school teacher, both from Badajoz. In 1986, Duque earned a degree in Aeronautical Engineering from the Universidad Politécnica de Madrid. In 1986, he worked for GMV and for the European Space Agency (ESA) for six years before being selected as an astronaut candidate in 1992.

Astronaut 
Duque underwent training in both Russia and the United States. His first spaceflight was as a mission specialist aboard Space Shuttle mission STS-95, during which Duque supervised ESA experimental modules. In October 2003, Duque visited the International Space Station on board of a Soyuz TMA Ship for several days during a crew changeover.  The scientific program of this visit was called by ESA/Spain Misión Cervantes.

University and Business 
In 2003, he started working at UPM School of Aeronautical Engineers as head of operations of the Spanish USOC, also lecturing students on space science and operations.

In 2006, Duque was named Managing Director (CEO) of Deimos Imaging, a private company, that in 2009 put in orbit the first Spanish earth observation satellite (Deimos 1) with uses in agriculture, forestry wildfire detection and control. In 2011, he was named Executive President of the Company.

Return to the ESA 
In October 2011, Duque returned to his position in the European Space Agency, retaking his position as an astronaut. Until 2015, he was the leader of the Flight Operations Office, with responsibility for ESA operations in the ISS. In 2016, Duque participated in ESA CAVES training. After that he assumed the responsibility of the review of future ESA crewed flights, within the ESA's astronaut corps.

Minister 

After the success of the motion of no confidence against the government of Mariano Rajoy in June 2018, Prime Minister Pedro Sanchez named Pedro Duque Minister of Science, Innovation and Universities.

In April 2019, Duque announced that his ministry was going to increase Spain's contribution to the European Space Agency by €701 million between 2020 and 2026 to ensure a proper contribution regarding the Spanish economy size.

As the rest of the Sánchez cabinet, Duque ran for the April 2019 and November 2019 general elections, being elected MP for Alicante. In January 2020, Sánchez confirmed Duque as minister of Science and Innovation, but the university affairs were granted to Manuel Castells, as the first minister of Universities. After being confirmed as minister of Science, he resigned as MP in 21 February 2020.

Honors and decorations 

Order Of Friendship of the Russian Federation (1995)
Grand Cross of Aeronautical Merit (1999)
Prince of Asturias Award of International Cooperation (1999)
 Doctor Honoris Causa of the Technical University of Valencia (2005)
 Medal "For Merit in Space Exploration" of the Russian federation (2011)
 Doctor Honoris Causa of the European University of Madrid (2013)
 Doctor Honoris Causa of the National University of Distance Education (2016)
 Doctor Honoris Causa of the University of Almería

See also 
 Lists of astronauts
 List of Hispanic astronauts

References

External links
ESA profile page
NASA Biography
Spacefacts biography of Pedro Duque
Events and Conferences
Telescope Hosting site in Nerpio, Spain
España: quién es Pedro Duque, el primer astronauta español y nuevo ministro de Ciencia

1963 births
Living people
Spanish astronauts
ESA astronauts
Astronaut-politicians
Aquanauts
European Space Agency personnel
Space Shuttle program astronauts
Polytechnic University of Madrid alumni
Government ministers of Spain
Science ministers
Members of the 13th Congress of Deputies (Spain)
Members of the 14th Congress of Deputies (Spain)